Mani Shankar is a Bollywood film director, holographic technology expert, writer and speaker. He is best known for introducing computer-generated imagery to India, and for designing the world's first holographic political campaign, which he designed for Narendra Modi during the 2012 Gujarat Legislative Assembly election.

He made five films as a Bollywood director, including 16 December, one of the highest-grossing films of 2002, and Tango Charlie, which was screened in several International Film Festivals and was named a permanent part of the UN's "anti-war" movies. Over his long career, Mani Shankar has worked on many films, advertisements and political campaigns.

Early life
Mani Shankar graduated as a Chemical Engineer from BITS Pilani in 1978. He worked for a few years as a research engineer in process engineering and drug delivery. During his time at BITS Pilani, he won a record 4 consecutive Holofest 'Best Hologram of The Year', earning the nickname "Young Mani".

Career
After over two decades of working in the film industry, Shankar made a shift into film production and started his own production house, Bhairav Films, which produced over a thousand advertisements, short films and image building films, as well as 5 Hindi feature films. Most of his short and feature films reflect a deep commitment to social causes and aim to provide an introspective experience to the audience.

In 1991, his Telugu film ‘Manishi’ won him the coveted Nandi award for Best Film, as well as Nandi Awards for Best Director and Best Screenplay writer. His Hindi feature film 16 December, which was among the top ten grossing films of 2002, with the highest return on investment for any film that year.

Tango Charlie tells the story of a soldier's constant battle with his conscience. It was screened at several International film festivals and was included in Amnesty International's list of classic anti-war movies.

Inspired by his history professor Indiana, he decided to helm a career-defining project that would encapsulate the experiences of his early twenties as an amateur archaeologist. This led to the making of the film Rudraksh, a futuristic supernatural film starring Sanjay Dutt, Bipasha Basu and Suniel Shetty. After the movie's release, he was allegedly often visited by forces of a secret Hindu organization, who questioned his deep knowledge of the demon realm.

Mukhbir (starring Om Puri, Suniel Shetty, Samir Dattani and Raima Sen) tells the story of a young man rising above a dangerous underworld and choosing to die a patriot. This movie was also critically acclaimed and screened at the Black International festival in Berlin.

Knock Out (starring Sanjay Dutt, Irrfan Khan and Kangana Ranaut).

Mani is an ardent believer in the simulated universe theory. He claims that our plane of existence is a mirror of a simulated hologram; his ideas have been discussed in the works of theoretical physicist Michio Kaku.

Filmography
Manishi (1991)Meri jaan Hindustan (Music Video) (1995)16 December (2002)Rudraksh (2004)Tango Charlie (2005)Mukhbiir (2008)Knock Out (2010)

 Holography 

Mani Shankar is known in India for introducing holograms to India. He spearheaded the first holographic campaign for Narendra Modi (the current PM of India)'' during the 2012 Gujarat Legislative Assembly election.

He has since conducted election campaigns for various parties, including the Telangana Rashtra Samithi during the 2014 Telangana Legislative Assembly election, who eventually won the race, 
as well as the Nationalist Congress Party during the 2014 Maharashtra Legislative Assembly election, which stemmed the decline of the party.

Augmented Reality 

In February of 2017, Mani Shankar launched the first live augmented reality political campaign in the world for Shri Devendra Fadnavis, Chief Minister of Maharashtra State, India. For the first time, such a campaign enabled an electoral candidate to virtually enter people's homes and softly pitch for votes.

The campaign was declared a success. The effectivity of augmented reality as a political campaign tool was established.

A series of augmented reality projects thus followed, in various fields ranging from film publicity, sports, spirituality and corporate launches.Guru Swami Ganapathy Sachidananda, former Cricket Captain Kapil Dev or movie star Rana Dagubbati are some of the celebrities who have appeared in augmented reality format for various promotional and communication purposes. Allah Rakha Rahman announced  on his official Facebook page that he got his augmented reality channels done by Mani Shankar and Kaali Sudheer.

References

External links 
 
 

Hindi-language film directors
Telugu people
Birla Institute of Technology and Science, Pilani alumni
Living people
1957 births